Hancock is a town in Washington County, Maryland, United States. The population was 1,557 at the 2020 census. The Western Maryland community is notable for being located at the narrowest part of the state. The north-south distance from the Pennsylvania state line to the West Virginia state line is only 1.8 miles (2.9 km) at Hancock.

History 
The name Hancock comes from Edward Joseph Hancock, Jr., who fought alongside George Washington during the American Revolutionary War. Individuals began settling in the area of modern-day Hancock during the 1730s. During the Civil War, on January 5, 1862, General Stonewall Jackson began the siege of the town, but did not succeed due to weather conditions.

Geography

The state of Maryland narrows to a width of less than two miles (3 km) in the Hancock area—the smallest non-vertex border-to-border distance of any U.S. state.

The Chesapeake & Ohio Canal passes through the town, and the Western Maryland Rail Trail connects Hancock with Fort Frederick State Park.

Climate
The climate in this area is characterized by hot, humid summers and generally mild to cool winters.  According to the Köppen Climate Classification system, Hancock has a humid subtropical climate, abbreviated "Cfa" on climate maps.

Transportation

The primary means of travel to and from Hancock is by road. Interstate 70 is the main highway serving the town. I-70 continues east to Baltimore and west to the southern suburbs of Pittsburgh. U.S. Route 40 runs concurrently with I-70 through the town, but just to the northwest, splits with I-70 to follow Interstate 68 westward towards Cumberland. U.S. Route 522 also traverses Hancock, heading northwest with I-70 into Pennsylvania and southward into eastern West Virginia towards Winchester, Virginia. Within the town, Maryland Route 144 serves as a local service route, following Main Street.

Demographics

2010 census
As of the census of 2010, there were 1,545 people, 694 households, and 407 families living in the town. The racial makeup of the town was 97.7% White, 0.4% African American, 0.5% Native American, 0.4% Asian, and 1.0% from two or more races. Hispanic or Latino of any race were 0.5% of the population.

There were 694 households, of which 28.5% had children under the age of 18 living with them, 37.6% were married couples living together, 15.1% had a female householder with no husband present, 5.9% had a male householder with no wife present, and 41.4% were non-families. 36.7% of all households were made up of individuals, and 14.3% had someone living alone who was 65 years of age or older. The average household size was 2.23 and the average family size was 2.86.

The median age in the town was 40.7 years. 22.4% of residents were under the age of 18; 8.8% were between the ages of 18 and 24; 23.5% were from 25 to 44; 27.6% were from 45 to 64; and 17.9% were 65 years of age or older. The gender makeup of the town was 47.7% male and 52.3% female.

2000 census
As of the census of 2000, there were 1,725 people, 735 households, and 462 families living in the town. The racial makeup of the town was 98.26% White, 0.35% African American, 0.35% Native American, 0.06% Asian, 0.12% Pacific Islander, 0.12% from other races, and 0.75% from two or more races. Hispanic or Latino of any race were 0.46% of the population.

There were 735 households, out of which 27.6% had children under the age of 18 living with them, 41.8% were married couples living together, 16.3% had a female householder with no husband present, and 37.1% were non-families. 31.2% of all households were made up of individuals, and 15.8% had someone living alone who was 65 years of age or older.  The average household size was 2.30 and the average family size was 2.86.

In the town, the population was spread out, with 24.5% under the age of 18, 9.5% from 18 to 24, 28.2% from 25 to 44, 21.9% from 45 to 64, and 15.8% who were 65 years of age or older.  The median age was 36 years. For every 100 females, there were 88.3 males.  For every 100 females age 18 and over, there were 80.8 males.

The median income for a household in the town was $28,750, and the median income for a family was $32,538. Males had a median income of $25,353 versus $20,304 for females. The per capita income for the town was $13,758.  About 11.6% of families and 16.8% of the population were below the poverty line, including 19.7% of those under age 18 and 13.7% of those age 65 or over.

Government
The town government consists of five elected officials: a Mayor and four members of the Town Council. Council members are elected to four-year terms, while the Mayor is elected to a two-year term. Hancock is one of the smallest municipalities in the state of Maryland. The current mayor is Tim Smith.

Notable people

Robert W. Brady – a Jesuit educator and president of the College of the Holy Cross and Boston College
Ike Powers – a professional baseball player who played two seasons for the Philadelphia Athletics from  through 
Charles H. Rowland – a Republican member of the U.S. House of Representatives from Pennsylvania from 1915 to 1919
Richard K. Sutherland – U.S. Army Lieutenant general, who served as General Douglas MacArthur's Chief of Staff during World War II
William Dorsey Swann – first U.S. drag artist and the first American on record who pursued legal and political action to defend the LGBTQ community's right to assemble

See also
 Sideling Hill

References

External links

Towns in Maryland
Towns in Washington County, Maryland
Maryland populated places on the Potomac River